Alan Wilson (born March 5, 1950) is justice of the Supreme Court of Queensland in the Trial Division. He was appointed to the bench in 2009, after serving as a judge in the District Court since 2001. He was named a Queen's Council in 1999.

See also

List of judges of the Supreme Court of Queensland

References

Judges of the Supreme Court of Queensland
21st-century Australian judges
Living people
1950 births
People from Brisbane
People educated at Brisbane State High School